Me and My Pal is a 1933 pre-Code short film starring Laurel and Hardy, directed by Lloyd French and Charles Rogers, and produced by Hal Roach. In 2016, it was one of several Laurel and Hardy films to be restored by the UCLA Film and Television Archive.

Plot 
Oliver Hardy plays a character who is preparing for his wedding day to the daughter of a wealthy oil magnate, Peter Cucumber. His friend, played by Stan Laurel, is the best man. While visiting Ollie in the morning, Stan reveals his wedding present – a jigsaw puzzle. The boys soon become preoccupied with the puzzle, as do other people – a taxi driver, Ollie's butler, a telegram delivery boy, even a cop. Cucumber is enraged at the delay at his daughter's wedding (especially after Stan has a wreath delivered to the reception), and makes his way to Ollie's house. The jigsaw puzzle is almost completed except for one elusive missing piece; the cop insists that no-one can leave the house until it is found, including Cucumber ("I don't care if he's Mr. Dill Pickle", sneers the cop, unimpressed). A fight breaks out, leading to a police raid in which all are arrested except Stan and Ollie, who manage to hide themselves. The puzzle gets knocked over in the mayhem; Ollie's telegram is from his broker, advising him to quickly sell his shares in "The Great International Horsecollar Corporation" (in which all of Ollie's fortune is invested), but a radio newsflash says the company took a "tremendous crash and failed". Despite Stan's assurance that "prosperity is just around the corner", Ollie angrily tells him to leave. As he leaves, Stan actually manages to find the jigsaw's missing piece, but before he can do anything more, a furious Ollie throws him out of the house.

Cast

References

External links 
 
 
 

1933 films
1933 comedy films
American black-and-white films
Films directed by Lloyd French
Laurel and Hardy (film series)
1933 short films
American comedy short films
Films directed by Charley Rogers
1930s English-language films
1930s American films